This is a list of radio networks and stations in Indonesia.

Public networks 
All networks below are owned by Radio Republik Indonesia (RRI).

Private networks 
Name-based (networks with single-name affiliates in more than one city/regency, sorted by ownership)

Owner-based (other networks with all-different affiliate names)
 Suzana Radio Network

Syndicated news network
 Jaring Radio Suara Surabaya
 KBR

Stations by city 
 List of radio stations in Banda Aceh
 List of radio stations in Bandung
 List of radio stations in Jakarta
 List of radio stations in Pekanbaru

References